Gary Wayne Janak (born March 22, 1962) is an American prelate of the Roman Catholic Church who was appointed as an auxiliary bishop for the Archdiocese of San Antonio in Texas in 2021.

Biography

Early life 
Born on March 22, 1962,  in El Campo, Texas, Janak entered Immaculate Heart of Mary Seminary in Santa Fe, New Mexico in 1982. He transferred to Assumption Seminary in San Antonio, Texas, in 1984.

On May 14, 1988, Janak was ordained a priest by Bishop Charles Victor Grahmann for the Diocese of Victoria.  He received a Licentiate in Canon Law from The Catholic University of America in Washington, D.C., in 1995 and a Master of Divinity degree in 1998 from the Oblate School of Theology in San Antonio.

Auxiliary Bishop of San Antonio 
Pope Francis appointed Janak as an auxiliary bishop for the Archdiocese of San Antonio and titular bishop of Dionysiana on February 15, 2021. On April 20, 2021, Janak was consecrated by Archbishop Gustavo Garcia Siller .

See also

 Catholic Church hierarchy
 Catholic Church in the United States
 Historical list of the Catholic bishops of the United States
 List of Catholic bishops of the United States
 Lists of patriarchs, archbishops, and bishops

References

External links

Roman Catholic Archdiocese of San Antonio Official Site 
Roman Catholic Diocese of Victoria Official Site

Episcopal succession

 
 

1962 births
Living people
People from El Campo, Texas
American Roman Catholic priests
Bishops appointed by Pope Francis